Spirits of the Western Sky is a solo album by Justin Hayward of The Moody Blues. It was Hayward's first solo album since his 1996 album The View from the Hill.

Background
The album was recorded in Genoa in Italy and in Nashville. On it, Hayward explores new areas – country and bluegrass on tracks like "What You Resist Persists", "Broken Dream" from The View from the Hill and "It’s Cold Outside of Your Heart" from The Moody Blues' 1983 album The Present.

Orchestration on the album is by Anne Dudley, an English composer and pop musician who has worked in both classical and pop genres. She is particularly known as a core member of the synthpop band Art of Noise, and as a film composer.

Hayward co-wrote the song "On The Road To Love" with Kenny Loggins.  The two artists were both on the road at that time and they were staying at the same hotel. Loggins also plays and sings on the track.

The bluegrass cover track of "It's Cold Outside Of Your Heart" was originally recorded for and released on the 2011 bluegrass tribute album Moody Bluegrass TWO...Much Love.

Track listing
All songs written by Justin Hayward unless otherwise noted.
 "In Your Blue Eyes" - 4:09
 "One Day, Someday" - 4:24
 "The Western Sky" - 6:54
 "The Eastern Sun" - 4:13
 "On The Road to Love" (Hayward, Kenny Loggins) - 3:35 
 "Lazy Afternoon" - 3:55
 "In the Beginning" - 3:38
 "It’s Cold Outside of Your Heart" - 4:01
 "What You Resist Persists" - 4:32
 "Broken Dream" - 5:55
 "Captivated By You" - 3:51
 "One Day, Someday" (Alternative Extended Version) - 6:15
 "Rising" - 0:22
 "Out There Somewhere" - 2:47
 "Out There Somewhere" (Raul Rincon Remix) - 8:06

Personnel
Justin Hayward - guitar, keyboards, vocals
Frederic Arturi - keyboards
Lele Melotti - drums
Alberto Parodi - programming
Tracey Ackerman - background vocals
Kenny Loggins - guitar, vocals on "On The Road To Love"

Charts

References

Justin Hayward albums
2013 albums